Idvallo (Welsh: Eidwal mab Owain) was a legendary king of the Britons as recounted by Geoffrey of Monmouth. He was the son of King Ingenius and he replaced King Enniaunus. Idvallo is said by Geoffrey to have reigned righteously to mend the ills his cousin had brought. He was succeeded by his cousin, Runo.

References

Legendary British kings
3rd-century BC legendary rulers